Ducklington Mead is a  biological Site of Special Scientific Interest east of Ducklington in Oxfordshire.

This traditionally managed meadow has diverse flora, such as the rare and declining snake's-head  fritillary. Flowering plants in drier areas include saw-wort, dropwort, lady's bedstraw and betony. There are also ditches with interesting wetland flora and an ancient hedge with a variety of shrubs.

The site is private land with no public access.

References

 
Sites of Special Scientific Interest in Oxfordshire